List of active Brazilian military aircraft is a list of military aircraft currently in service with the Brazilian Armed Forces.

Brazilian Air Force

Current inventory

Brazilian Army Aviation

Current inventory

Brazilian Naval Aviation

Current inventory

See also
 Brazilian Air Force
 Brazilian Armed Forces

References

External links

Brazilian military aircraft
Brazilian military aircraft
Aircraft